The One: Kagayaku Kisetsu e anime series, which encompasses two original video animation series produced by different studios, is based on the visual novel One: Kagayaku Kisetsu e by the Japanese software company Tactics, but have different stories and settings. The story from the first series follows a group of young high school girls who once knew a boy named Kōhei Orihara, but who eventually disappeared from each of the girls' lives. After he left, most of the girls forgot about him, but his childhood friend Mizuka Nagamori promised to never forget him. The story from the second series follows Kōhei Orihara, a male high school student, and the relationships that he forms with three girls from his school over a period of time. After forming a relationship, however, he finds that the girl starts to forget about him.

The first anime adaptation under the title One: Kagayaku Kisetsu e is produced by KSS, animated by Triple X, written and directed by Yōsei Morino, and features character design by Jun Satō who based the designs on Itaru Hinoue's original concept. Four episodes were produced which were released separately as OVAs on Region 2 DVDs between August 10, 2001 and May 24, 2002 by KSS. The series was re-released as a one-disc DVD box set on February 29, 2008 by JSDSS.

The second anime adaptation under the title  is produced by Cherry Lips, animated by Arms, directed by Kan Fukumoto, written by Tetsuya Ōishi, and once again features character design by Jun Satō who based the designs on Itaru Hinoue's original concept. Three episodes were produced which were also released separately as OVAs on Region 2 DVDs between November 21, 2003 and May 28, 2004 by Cherry Lips. Unlike the first anime adaptation, One: True Stories is an adult series. The three episodes of the second anime adaptation were licensed for North American distribution by Media Blasters. The episodes were released in a single DVD volume on August 16, 2005.

The first anime adaptation used five pieces of theme music, and the second used three. The opening theme for the first anime adaptation is "Eternity" sung by Millio; the first ending theme, used in episode one, is "Rose" by Sayuri Yoshida; the second ending theme, used in episode two, is "Impurity" by Haruhi Terada; the third ending theme, used in episode three, is "Kaze no Mieru Hi" by Machiko Toyoshima; the fourth ending theme, used in episode four, is "Kono Mama ga Ii yo" by Ayako Kawasumi.


One: Kagayaku Kisetsu e

One: True Stories

References

One